Massimiliano Palumbara or Massimiliano Palombella (died 23 Jan 1607) was a Roman Catholic prelate who served as Archbishop of Benevento (1574–1607). He was the nephew of Cardinal Giacomo Savelli, his predecessor as Archbishop, through his sister.

Biography
Massimiliano Palumbara was appointed Archbishop in the Consistory of 17 May 1574 by Pope Gregory XIII. On 26 Sep 1574, he was consecrated bishop in Rome in the church of San Francesco a Ripa by Giulio Antonio Santorio, Cardinal-Priest of San Bartolomeo all'Isola, with Giovanni Andrea Croce, Bishop of Tivoli, and Alfonso Binarini, Bishop of Camerino, serving as co-consecrators.

He served as Archbishop of Benevento until his death on 23 Jan 1607. On 29 September 1599 he held a provincial synod, attended by seven of his suffragan bishops, who decided that the abuse should be suppressed in which the clergy would remove relics of saints from their cases and allow them to be touched by lay people.

He died on 23 January 1607 at the age of 33, and was interred in the Chapel of S. Antonio of Padua in the Cathedral.

While bishop, he was the principal co-consecrator of Flaminio Filonardi, Bishop of Aquino (1579); Scipione Gesualdo, Archbishop of Conza (1585); and Enrico Caetani, Titular Patriarch of Alexandria (1585).

References

External links and additional sources
 
 (for Chronology of Bishops) 
 (for Chronology of Bishops) 

16th-century Italian Roman Catholic bishops
17th-century Italian Roman Catholic bishops
Bishops appointed by Pope Gregory XIII
1607 deaths